This is a list of settlements in the Ioannina regional unit, Greece.

 Achladies
 Aetomilitsa
 Aetopetra, Konitsa
 Aetopetra, Zitsa
 Aetorrachi
 Agia Anastasia
 Agia Marina
 Agia Paraskevi, Konitsa
 Agia Paraskevi, Zagori
 Agia Triada
 Agia Varvara
 Agios Andreas
 Agios Ioannis
 Agios Kosmas
 Agios Minas
 Agios Nikolaos
 Aidonochori
 Alepochori
 Amarantos
 Amfithea
 Ampeleia
 Ampelochori
 Anargyroi
 Anatoli
 Anatoliki
 Anilio
 Ano Lapsista
 Ano Pedina
 Ano Ravenia
 Anthochori, Dodoni
 Anthochori, Metsovo
 Anthrakitis
 Areti
 Argyrochori
 Aristi
 Armata
 Artopoula
 Asfaka
 Asimochori
 Asprangeloi
 Asprochori
 Asvestochori
 Avgo
 Bafra
 Baousioi
 Bestia
 Bizani
 Charavgi
 Charokopi
 Chinka
 Chionades
 Chouliarades
 Chrysorrachi
 Chrysovitsa
 Dafnofyto
 Dafnoula
 Delvinaki
 Delvinakopoulo
 Demati
 Derviziana
 Despotiko
 Dikorfo
 Dilofo
 Dimokorio
 Dipotamo
 Distrato
 Dodoni
 Doliana
 Doliani
 Dolo
 Dovla
 Dragopsa
 Dramesioi
 Drosochori
 Drosopigi
 Drymades
 Ekklisochori
 Elafos
 Elafotopos
 Elati
 Elatochori
 Elefthero
 Eleousa
 Elliniko
 Episkopiko
 Exochi, Ioannina
 Exochi, Konitsa
 Farangi
 Flambourari
 Fortosi
 Foteino
 Fourka
 Fragkades
 Gannadio
 Gavrisioi
 Georganoi
 Geroplatanos
 Giourganista
 Gorgopotamos
 Grammeno
 Granitsa
 Granitsopoula
 Greveniti
 Grimpovo
 Ieromnimi
 Iliochori
 Iliokali
 Iliorrachi
 Ioannina Island
 Ioannina
 Itea
 Kakolakkos
 Kalarites
 Kalentzi
 Kallithea, Konitsa
 Kallithea, Mastorochoria
 Kalochori
 Kaloutas
 Kalpaki
 Kapesovo
 Karitsa
 Karyes
 Kastani
 Kastaniani
 Kastanonas
 Kastritsa
 Katamachi
 Katarraktis
 Kato Lapsista
 Kato Meropi
 Kato Pedina
 Kato Ravenia
 Katsikas
 Kavallari
 Kavasila
 Kedros
 Kefalochori
 Kefalovryso
 Kerasia
 Kerasovo
 Kipoi
 Kleidonia, Konitsa
 Kleidonia, Mastorochoria
 Klimatia
 Kokkinochoma
 Konitsa
 Kontsika
 Kopani
 Koritiani
 Kosmira
 Kostaniani
 Kouklesi
 Kouklioi
 Koukouli
 Koumaria
 Kourenta
 Koutseli
 Kranoula
 Krapsi
 Krya
 Kryfovo
 Kryoneri
 Kryovrysi
 Ktismata
 Lagkada
 Laista
 Lavdani 
 Lefkothea
 Leptokarya
 Ligkiades
 Ligopsa
 Limni
 Lippa
 Lithino
 Lofiskos
 Longades
 Lyngos
 Makrino
 Manassis
 Manoliasa
 Manteio
 Marmara
 Matsouki
 Mavronoros
 Mavropoulo
 Mavrovouni
 Mazaraki
 Mazi
 Mazia
 Mega Gardiki
 Mega Peristeri
 Megali Gotista
 Melia
 Melingoi
 Melissopetra
 Meropi
 Mesovouni
 Metamorfosi
 Metsovo
 Michalitsi
 Mikra Gotista
 Mikro Peristeri
 Milea
 Molista
 Molyvdoskepastos
 Monastiri
 Monodendri
 Monolithi
 Mousiotitsa
 Mouzakaioi
 Myrodafni
 Negades
 Negrades
 Neochori
 Neochoropoulo
 Neokaisareia
 Nikanoras
 Oraiokastro
 Oreino Xirovaltou
 Oxya
 Pades
 Palaiochori, Dodoni
 Palaiochori, Tzoumerka
 Palaiopyrgos
 Palaioselli
 Paliouri
 Papingo
 Parakalamos
 Pardalitsa
 Pedini
 Perama
 Peratis
 Perdika
 Peristeri
 Perivleptos
 Pesta
 Petra
 Petralona
 Petrovouni
 Petsali
 Pigadia
 Pigi, Ioannina
 Plagia
 Plaisia
 Platanas
 Platania, Dodoni
 Platania, Ioannina
 Platanoussa
 Plikati
 Pogoniani
 Polydoro
 Polygyros
 Polylofo
 Pontikates
 Potamia
 Potistika
 Pournia
 Pramanta
 Prosilio
 Protopappas
 Psina
 Pyrgos
 Pyrsogianni
 Radovizi
 Raftanaioi
 Raiko
 Ravenia
 Repetista
 Riachovo
 Rodotopi
 Romanos
 Roupia
 Seniko
 Seriziana
 Serviana
 Sistrouni
 Sitaria
 Sitsaina
 Skamneli
 Sklivani
 Smyrtia
 Soulopoulo
 Spothoi
 Stavraki
 Stavroskiadi
 Stratinista
 Syrrako
 Teriachi
 Terovo
 Theriakisi
 Tristeno
 Tsepelovo
 Vageniti
 Valanidia
 Vaptistis
 Vargiades
 Varlaam
 Vasiliki
 Vasiliko
 Vasilopoulo
 Vatatades
 Vathypedo
 Vereniki
 Vissani
 Vitsa
 Vlachatano
 Votonosi
 Vouliasta
 Vounoplagia
 Vourmpiani
 Voutsaras
 Vovousa 
 Vradeto
 Vrosina
 Vrotismeni
 Vrysochori
 Vrysoula
 Zalongo
 Zitsa 
 Zoodochos
 Zotiko

By municipality

See also
List of towns and villages of Greece

Ioannina